Herbert Bostock (4 May 1869 – 20 February 1954) was an English cricketer  who played for Derbyshire in 1897.

Bostock was born in Ilkeston of a mining family, and was a child when his father died. Bostock made his debut for Derbyshire in the 1897 season against Marylebone Cricket Club, in which he scored nine runs from the opening order. He played three more first-class games in the season in the County Championship. His career high score of 36  against Nottinghamshire put him high in the club's championship batting averages.

Bostock was a right-handed batsman and played six innings in four first-class matches with a top score of 36 and an average of 18.75

Bostock died at Ilkeston.

References 

1869 births
1954 deaths
Derbyshire cricketers
English cricketers
People from Ilkeston
Cricketers from Derbyshire